William Wiehe Collins H.R.I. R.B.C. (4 August 1862 – 16 February 1951) was an English architectural and landscape genre painter.

Life and work

Between 1884 and 1885, Collins studied at the Lambeth School of Art following which he attended the Académie Julian in Paris between 1886 and 1887. From 1886 he exhibited at many of the London galleries including the Royal Academy, Royal Society of British Artists (elected 1906) and the Royal Institution (elected 1898). He served in the Dardanelles and Egypt in the Navy during World War I. He travelled widely producing paintings in England, Spain and Italy.

He died in Cossington, Somerset on 16 February 1951 leaving his wife, Jane.

Selected works

Collins' pencil and watercolour painting The market place, Ely was first exhibited in 1905 and was sold at auction on 19 November 1992 for £715.

References

External links
 
 

English landscape painters
British genre painters
English watercolourists
1862 births
1951 deaths